Sweet Music is a 1935 American musical film directed by Alfred E. Green, written by Jerry Wald, Carl Erickson and Warren Duff, and starring Rudy Vallée, Ann Dvorak, Ned Sparks, Helen Morgan, Robert Armstrong and Allen Jenkins. It was released by Warner Bros. on February 23, 1935.

Premise
Bonnie Haydon (Ann Dvorak) is an aspiring star, who is often paired with Skip Houston (Rudy Vallée) by coincidence, much to her dismay. They taunt each other in a very screwball style, but over time, she learns that she has Houston to thank for her success.

Songs
 "Sweet Music"
 "There's a Different You (in Your Heart)"
 "Ev'ry Day"
 "The Good Green Acres of Home"
 "Outside"
 "There Is a Tavern in the Town" ("The Drunkard Song") 
 "I See Two Lovers"
 "Fare Thee Well, Annabelle"

Cast     
Rudy Vallée as Skip Houston
Ann Dvorak as Bonnie Haydon
Ned Sparks as 'Ten Percent' Nelson
Helen Morgan as Helen Morgan
Robert Armstrong as 'Dopey' Malone
Allen Jenkins as Barney Cowan 
Alice White as Lulu Betts Malone
Joseph Cawthorn as Sidney Selzer
Al Shean as Sigmund Selzer
Phillip Reed as Grant
William B. Davidson as Billy Madison
Henry O'Neill as Louis Trumble
Russell Hicks as Mayor
Clay Clement as Mr. Johnson

References

External links 

 

1935 films
Warner Bros. films
American musical films
1935 musical films
Films directed by Alfred E. Green
American black-and-white films
1930s English-language films
1930s American films
Films scored by Bernhard Kaun